Elefterie Sinicliu (born 4 October 1895, Echimăuţi, Orhei - died in 20th century) was an agronomist and politician from Bessarabia, member of the Moldovan Parliament (1917–1918).

Biography 
In 1917 he participated in the local congress held in Chișinău. On 27 March / 9 April 1918 he voted for the unification of Bessarabia with Romania. He was an officer in the Bessarabian army and in 1919 he organized the artillery of this province.

Bibliography 
Gheorghe E. Cojocaru, Sfatul Țării: itinerar, Civitas, Chişinău, 1998, 
Mihai Taşcă, Sfatul Țării şi actualele authorităţi locale, "Timpul de dimineaţă", no. 114 (849), June 27, 2008 (page 16)

External links 
 Arhiva pentru Sfatul Tarii
 Deputaţii Sfatului Ţării şi Lavrenti Beria

Notes

Moldovan MPs 1917–1918
Year of death missing
1895 births